The masked crimson tanager (Ramphocelus nigrogularis) is a species of bird in the family Thraupidae.
It is found in Bolivia, Brazil, Colombia, Ecuador, and Peru.
Its natural habitats are subtropical or tropical swamps and subtropical or tropical moist shrubland.

The masked crimson tanager was first described by German naturalist Johann Baptist von Spix in 1825. Its species name is derived from the Latin words niger "black", and gularis "throated". It is one of nine species of brightly coloured tanagers of the genus Ramphocelus. Mitochondrial DNA evidence indicates its closest relative is the crimson-backed tanager (R. dimidiatus), and the two split around 800,000 years ago.

Measuring 18 to 19 cm (7–7.5 in) in length, the adult male has a black face, wings, mantle, belly and tail, and is a bright red elsewhere in its plumage. The bill has a silver sheen. The female resembles the male but has a brownish belly and duller plumage overall, while the juvenile is duller still. It resembles the vermilion tanager (Calochaetes coccineus) but the latter lives at higher altitudes.

The masked crimson tanager makes a high-pitched single note variously transcribed as tchlink or "tink", and a simple melody often sung at dawn.

The masked crimson tanager is found across Amazonia and is abundant. It prefers to dwell near bodies of water such as lakes, swamps or rivers, generally at altitudes below 600 m (2000 ft). Masked crimson tanagers move about in troops of 10 to 12 birds. The species can form mixed species flocks with the silver-beaked tanager (Ramphocelus carbo). It is frugivorous (fruit-eating).

Behavior
The masked crimson tanager has been speculated to engage in reverse sexual dominance behavior similar to their congener pair, the silver-beaked tanager. The masked crimson tanagers, who belong to the passerine bird order exhibit this behavior similar to that of their cousin.  However, there is no observable evidence to support the hypothesis that the masked crimson tanager are among the rare and unexplained phenomenon of reverse sexual dominance. Under normal circumstances, passerine species of birds exemplify a default hierarchy of dominance wherein larger, heavier birds tend to dominate the smaller, lighter birds and males tend to dominate females.  Between masked crimson tanagers and the silver-beaked tanager, individuals engage in a form of interference competition, also known as competition by resource defense, when partitioning resource-rich habitats.  The masked crimson tanager prefer to inhabit sites close to or around oxbow lakes, a common geographical feature of their native Amazon biome. They demonstrate aggression while defending the more productive areas around the lakes, causing the silver-beaked tanager to occupy the riparian forest.  The masked crimson tanagers are competitively superior and dominate most interspecies interactions with their cousin.

Breeding
The masked crimson tanager breeds in between the dry and wet seasons of the seasonal tropics that they occupy. This species of tanager participates in cooperative breeding, which involves the communal care and protection of the offspring.  For the masked crimson tanager, as well as other lake-margin bird species, cooperative breeding may be favored due to high population density and scarcity of habitable space.

In neotropical forests, the masked crimson tanager congregates in mixed flocks much like those seen in flycatchers and vireos.  The degree to which the masked crimson tanager forms mixed flocks correlates with the relative extent to which broad-leafed canopy make up the composition of the neotropical forest.

Feeding
Like most tanagers, masked crimson tanagers are mainly frugivorous, supplementing their fruit diets with small insects such as flying termites.  Their insectivorous tendency is driven by the periodic cycle of the breeding of termites, which produce winged males and females when sexually active.  These termites are richer in nutrients than normal wood termites and therefore it may become more ecologically sound for the masked crimson tanager to feed on these insects to supplement their existing diets.

Masked crimson tanagers may also feed on the nectar of flowers as part of their diet. They have not been observed opening flowers themselves, only feeding on nectar from flowers already been opened by some other species of bird or insect. They feed on flowers of Erythrina fusca plants without damaging them, while simultaneously contacting the anthers of the flowers with their heads, thus making them effective pollinators.

Gallery

References

External links

masked crimson tanager
Birds of the Amazon Basin
Birds of the Colombian Amazon
Birds of the Ecuadorian Amazon
Birds of the Peruvian Amazon
masked crimson tanager
Taxonomy articles created by Polbot